The Government Development Bank for Puerto Rico (GDB) — (BGF)— is the government bond issuer, intragovernmental bank, fiscal agent, and financial advisor of the government of Puerto Rico. The bank, along with its subsidiaries and affiliates, serves as the principal entity through which Puerto Rico channels its issuance of bonds. As an overview, the different executive agencies of the government of Puerto Rico and its government-owned corporations either issue bonds with the bank as a proxy, or owe debt to the bank itself (as the bank is a government-owned corporation as well).

History
The Bank was the brainchild of Governor Rexford Guy Tugwell, who signed Law 253 of May 13, 1942, creating the institution in charge of economic development for the Government of Puerto Rico. A subsequent law in 1945 expanded its responsibilities to include serving as the fiscal agent for, and financial advisor of, the government of Puerto Rico.  The highly centralized government structure set up by Tugwell, one of President Franklin Delano Roosevelt's Brain Trusters required such a fiscal agent, contrary to the model followed by most states, in which each agency and political subdivision is responsible for issuing its own bonds.

During its formative years, the GDB helped financially structure the Puerto Rico Water Resources Authority, the new publicly owned electric company that generated much of its power from a hydroelectric system. During its first decade, GDB financed infrastructure development, particularly the development of low-cost housing.

Between 1951 and 1965, the GDB issued over $1 billion in bonds to finance the islands' infrastructure, contributing to Puerto Rico's  economic growth.  It also spurred the growth of the private sector, financing Puerto Rico's first condominium and several of its first shopping centers built in 1956, when private banks were reticent in assuming such ground-breaking risks.

During former Gov. Pedro Rosselló's administration, and under Marcos Rodríguez Ema's presidency, the GDB established, financed and gave to the people of Puerto Rico the new Puerto Rico Museum of Art, which, within years, has become the island's second-best art museum, after the Ponce Museum of Art founded by Luis A. Ferré, a philanthropist and former Governor.

The GDB is in the process of winding down its operations in an orderly fashion under Title VI of the Puerto Rico Oversight, Management, and Economic Stability Act, Publ. Law 114-187 of June 30, 2016 (PROMESA).

Presidents

See also
 List of bonds issued by Puerto Rico

References

External links
 
 http://gdb.pr.gov/

1948 establishments in Puerto Rico
Finance in Puerto Rico
Government-owned corporations of Puerto Rico
Public debt of Puerto Rico
Banks established in 1948
National development banks